North Palatinate is a region in southwest Germany with an area of just 650 km², making it the smallest landscape in the Palatinate region of the German state of Rhineland-Palatinate.

Geography 
As its name suggests, the North Palatinate forms the northern part of the Palatinate.

The other regions of the Palatinate are Anterior Palatinate, South Palatinate and West Palatinate.

Towns 
The North Palatinate is only sparsely populated. The three largest towns all have fewer than 10,000 inhabitants:
 Eisenberg
 Kirchheimbolanden
 Rockenhausen

References 

 
Regions of Rhineland-Palatinate